Asen Zlatarov (Assin Zlataroff) (4 February 1885 – 22 December 1936) was a Bulgarian biochemist, writer and social activist.

Life

He was born in Haskovo on 4 February 1885. He studied chemistry at the University of Geneva (1904-07). In 1908 he became a Ph.D. in Chemistry and Physics at Grenoble University. He taught in Plovdiv, and in Munich (1909-1910). He edited the magazines "Chemistry and Industry" and "Nature and Science" and the libraries "Naturfilosophical Reading" and "Science and Life".

From 1924, he was visiting professor, and from 1935 a regular professor at the Sofia University. He is the author of literary articles, poems, lyrical prose and a novel. In the period (1925 - 1927) he is a member of the literary circle "Sagittarius". He collaborated with the literary period in the 1930s. An active participant is in the Bulgarian People's Maritime Agreement.

Prof. Assen Zlatarov participated in the establishment of the Committee for the Protection of the Jews, together with the widow of the statesman Petko Karavelov - the public actress Ekaterina Karavelova, the writer Anton Strashimirov, Prof. Petko Staynov and others. The former "Mir" and "Word" newspapers published articles against the established committee, saying that it was not the job of Bulgaria, even more so for individual citizens, to be confused with the affairs of great Germany. On July 3, 1933, a meeting was thwarted, where lecturers were Ekaterina Karavelova and Anton Strashimirov.

“Prof. D-r. Assen Zlatarov” University (Университет „Проф. д-р Асен Златаров” - Бургас) 
“Prof. D-r. Assen Zlatarov” University, also known as Burgas Technical University (BTU) is a public university in Burgas, Bulgaria named after the renowned scholar. The University was founded on October 6, 1963 by Decree #162 of the Bulgarian Council of Ministers as a Higher Chemico-technological institute and formally named “Prof. D-r. Assen Zlatarov”. As of 2007, “Prof. D-r. Assen Zlatarov” University is accredited by resolution №16 of 17.05. 2007 of the National Evaluation and Accreditation Agency and is a member of the European University Association (EUA).

Some publications
 Assin Zlataroff (1908). Sur quelques matières colorantes nouvelles du groupe des indulines, préparées au moyen du p-diamido-di-o-tolylméthane ; 3'amino-mésobenzyl-1.2-naphtacridine et quelques dérivés. Dissertation: Th. Universit́e Grenoble.
 Assin Zlataroff (1923). Die Genussmittel Bulgariens, Sofia, Drück, "Hudojnik".

References

Bulgarian chemists
People from Haskovo
1885 births
1936 deaths
Thracian Bulgarians
Academic staff of Sofia University
20th-century Bulgarian scientists